Malefactor, Ade is the fifth album by the experimental rock band Red Krayola, released in 1989 by Glass Records. The album was adopted by Drag City and re-issued on CD in 2000.

Critical reception
The Spin Alternative Record Guide praised the "lovely, scrambled warmth" of the album's sound, and called it a "moistly humanistic piece of work."

Track listing

Personnel 

Red Krayola
Albert Oehlen
Mayo Thompson

Additional musicians and production
Werner Büttner
Rudinger Carl
Andreas Dorau

References

External links 
 

1989 albums
Drag City (record label) albums
Red Krayola albums